Hong Kong Football Club (HKFC),  established in 1886, is a private members' club in Hong Kong. The name reflects the origin as a club for playing association football and rugby. 

The club is situated in Happy Valley, with the sports pitches being inside the Happy Valley Racecourse. The 2,750-capacity Hong Kong Football Club Stadium is where all the club's rugby and soccer matches are played and it is also the home pitch for most of the Hong Kong Rugby Union's international matches. It is also the venue for the HKFC International Rugby Tens and HKFC International Soccer Sevens tournaments. The club is committed to facilitating the development and participation of numerous sports in Hong Kong through close collaboration with National Sports Associations and organising sports activities for members and non-members.

History

Hong Kong Football Club was founded in 1886 by Sir James Haldane Lockhart, following a meeting that was held at the Victoria Recreation Gymnasium on 12 February 1886. The names derives from its establishment as a club for playing Association and Rugby Football (now known as rugby union) – not just as an association football (soccer) club as many think today.

The first sport the club played was in fact rugby union, on 16 February 1886, four days after the club formed. The first soccer match of the club was played on 16 March 1886, against the Royal Engineers.

The now famous Hong Kong International Rugby Sevens was founded by and first played at the Club in 1976. Sports Road continued to be the venue until it outgrew its home and was moved to the Hong Kong Government Stadium (now the Hong Kong Stadium) in 1982.

The clubhouse and pitches were situated adjacent to the racecourse. But in 1995, as part of a redevelopment of the racecourse, the club moved into a brand new, 64,000 square metre, purpose-built home, with the main building being outside the race track, and the main pitch, all weather hockey pitch, bowling green and sports bar being inside the racetrack.

In 2011, HKFC celebrated their 125th anniversary as a club.

Present day

HKFC and other private sports clubs have always worked to enable the development of numerous sports in Hong Kong and have, in many circumstances, helped take the sports to the international sporting stage. Sports including rugby, soccer, squash, tennis, hockey, lawn bowls, netball, golf, sailing and rowing are supported by an array of dedicated private sports clubs.

HKFC promotes a total of 11 sports, including rugby, soccer, squash, tennis, hockey, lawn bowls, netball, crickets, golf, sailing and rowing. It works closely with the Hong Kong Rugby Union, Hong Kong Football Association, Hong Kong Squash Association, Hong Kong Hockey Association, Hong Kong Lawn Bowls Association, Hong Kong Netball Association and Hong Kong Tennis Association.

Senior leadership 
The Club has been traditionally led by a President and a Chairman; the Club keeps extensive records of these positions since World War II.

 President: Nick Hunsworth (2018–)
 Chairman: Neil Jensen (2022–)

Post-War Presidents 

 Col. W.M. Thompson (unofficial; 1946)
 Sir Arthur Morse (1946–1953)
 Sir Michael Turner (1953–1959)
 D. Black (1959–1961)
 Col. H.B.L. Dowbiggin (1961–1966)
 Sir John Saunders (1966–1968)
 V.O. Roberts (1968–1978)
 H.M.G Forsgate (1978–2001)
 D. Agnew (2002–2018)

Post-War Chairmen 

 J. Redman (unofficial; 1946)
 J. Skinner (1946–1948)
 D. Black (1948–1949)
 J. Skinner (1949–1953); second term
 J. R. Henderson (1953–1955)
 K. W. Forrow (1955–1958)
 B. I. Bickford (1958–1959)
 K. W. Forrow (1959–1961); second term
 H. H. Holgate (1961–1962)
 T. V. C. Reynolds (1962–1963)
 B. C. Penman (1963–1966)
 E. M. Laishley (1966–1967)
 H. Van Echten (1967–1970)
 E. M. Laishley (1970–1972); second term
 R. Gaff (1972–1977)
 J. C. Cartner (1977–1979)
 A. A. Lister (1979–1982)
 J. A. B. Duncan (1982–1985)
 K. J. Marshall (1985–1988)
 A. T. Robertson (1988–1990)
 M. J. Moir (1990–1995)
 N. C. Bennett (1995–1997)
 A. Macleod (1997–1999)
 R. Neish (1999–2003)
 J. Collins-Taylor (2003–2006)
 A. J. C. Brown (2006–2008)
 A. C. Fook (2008–2012)
 J. J. Shanahan (2012–2018)
 M. J. Wood (2018–2022)

Sports

Football

Honours
Hong Kong First Division
Champions (3): 1919–20, 2017–18, 2020–21
Runners-up (3): 2014–15, 2015–16, 2018–19
Hong Kong Second Division
Champions (13): 1972–73, 1976–77, 1978–79, 1985–86, 1987–88, 1992–93, 1994–95, 1997–98, 1998–99, 2000–01, 2004–05, 2005–06, 2008–09
Runners-up (2): 1988–89, 2007–08
Hong Kong Senior Shield
Champions (5): 1898–99, 1907–08, 1915–16, 1918–19, 1921–22
Hong Kong Junior Challenge Shield
Champions (6): 1976–77, 1978–79, 1992–93, 1994–95, 1996–97, 2004–05

Rugby
Rugby was the first sport to be played by the Club, with a game held on 16th February 1886 between civilians and the British Army garrison, then stationed in Hong Kong. That game was played on a pitch within the Happy Valley racetrack on Hong Kong Island where the Club is still located today. Since these simple beginnings, Hong Kong Football Club has always played a role in the playing and organisation of rugby in Hong Kong, with many of Hong Kong's leading professionals and business people having played for the Club.

References

External links
HKFC Official Website

Football clubs in Hong Kong
Sports clubs established in 1886
Hong Kong rugby union teams
Happy Valley, Hong Kong
1886 establishments in Hong Kong
Multisports